José Carlos Nepomuceno Mozer (born 19 September 1960) is a Brazilian former professional footballer who played as a central defender, and is a manager.

In his career, he was mainly associated with Benfica in Portugal, which he represented in two separate spells. He also spent three years with French club Marseille.

Mozer appeared for Brazil at the 1990 World Cup.

Club career
Born in Rio de Janeiro, Mozer starting playing for local Clube de Regatas do Flamengo, which he helped win the Copa Libertadores and the Intercontinental Cup, both in 1981. After well more than 100 official appearances he left for Portugal and S.L. Benfica, being an undisputed starter from the beginning and helping the club to the Primeira Liga in 1988–89 while scoring more than ten overall goals in his first stint; also that season, he partnered compatriot Ricardo Gomes in the heart of the defence.

Mozer was sold to Olympique de Marseille in 1989 for a transfer fee of 25 million francs, with his agent Manuel Barbosa reportedly securing a commission of up to 15%. He faced his former side in the campaign's European Cup semifinals, a 2–2 controversial aggregate exit – again, he rarely missed a game, and helped L'OM to three consecutive Ligue 1 conquests.

Subsequently, the 32-year-old Mozer returned to Benfica, where he still managed to amass more than 75 overall appearances until his departure in 1995, after which he saw out his career in Japan at Kashima Antlers. He was the first player to score in penalty shootouts in two European Cup Finals, in 1988 and 1991.

After working some years as a sports commentator for Sport TV – he resided in Portugal– Mozer eventually became a manager. On 24 October 2006 he signed a two-year contract with Angolan club G.D. Interclube, leading them to the 2007 Girabola title but being dismissed from his post in April 2008 after a 0–3 away defeat against Zamalek SC in the second round of the CAF Champions League.

On 6 July 2009, Mozer agreed to a one-year deal with Raja Casablanca of Morocco, being sacked shortly after. In December 2010 he returned to Portugal, becoming Associação Naval 1º de Maio's third coach in only 14 matches, with the Figueira da Foz team eventually ranking last in the league; in early November 2011 he was appointed at the other side that had suffered top-level relegation, Portimonense SC.

International career
Mozer played 32 times for Brazil, over roughly ten years. After missing the 1986 FIFA World Cup through injury, he was picked for the 1990 edition in Italy; he was booked in the first two group stage matches (both wins), and did not appear in the round of 16 against Argentina, a 0–1 elimination.

Originally selected for the 1994 World Cup as well, Mozer was diagnosed with jaundice, left out of the squad and replaced with Aldair.

Career statistics

Club

International

Honours

Player
Flamengo
Campeonato Carioca: 1981, 1986
Copa Libertadores: 1981
Intercontinental Cup: 1981
Campeonato Brasileiro Série A: 1982, 1983

Benfica
Primeira Liga: 1988–89, 1993–94
Taça de Portugal: 1992–93; Runner-up 1988–89
European Cup runner-up: 1987–88

Marseille
Ligue 1: 1989–90, 1990–91, 1991–92
Coupe de France runner-up: 1990–91
European Cup runner-up: 1990–91

Kashima Antlers
J1 League: 1996

Manager
Interclube
Girabola: 2007

References

External links

1960 births
Living people
Footballers from Rio de Janeiro (city)
Brazilian footballers
Association football defenders
Campeonato Brasileiro Série A players
CR Flamengo footballers
Primeira Liga players
S.L. Benfica footballers
Ligue 1 players
Olympique de Marseille players
J1 League players
Kashima Antlers players
Brazil international footballers
1983 Copa América players
1990 FIFA World Cup players
Brazilian expatriate footballers
Expatriate footballers in Portugal
Expatriate footballers in France
Expatriate footballers in Japan
Brazilian expatriate sportspeople in Portugal
Brazilian expatriate sportspeople in France
Brazilian expatriate sportspeople in Japan
Brazilian football managers
G.D. Interclube managers
Raja CA managers
Primeira Liga managers
Liga Portugal 2 managers
Associação Naval 1º de Maio managers
Portimonense S.C. managers
Brazilian expatriate football managers
Expatriate football managers in Angola
Expatriate football managers in Morocco
Expatriate football managers in Portugal
Brazilian expatriate sportspeople in Angola
Brazilian expatriate sportspeople in Morocco
Botola managers